The Central African Republic has abolished capital punishment, after the National Assembly passed a bill abolishing it on 27 May 2022. Prior to its abolition in law, the nation was considered "Abolitionist in Practice." Its last executions, which were of six unnamed men, took place in January 1981.

In 2018, Roland Achille Bangue-Betangai, the Chairman of the Legislation Committee of the Parliament of the Central African Republic, introduced a bill to abolish the death penalty in the country. In March of the following year, The Speaker of the National Assembly, Laurent Ngon-Baba, created a joint committee examining the bill.

References 

Central African Republic
Law of the Central African Republic